Type 68 may refer to:

Type 68 assault rifle, a North Korean variant of the AKM
Type 68 pistol, a North Korean variant of the TT pistol

See also
Type 63 assault rifle, often incorrectly referred to as Type 68